Ilija Nestorovski (born 12 March 1990) is a Macedonian professional footballer who plays as a forward for Serie A club Udinese and the North Macedonia national team.

Club career
Born in Prilep, SR Macedonia, Yugoslavia, Nestorovski started his career at hometown club FK Pobeda. Joining their youth academy in 2000, he made his senior debut in 2006. Between 2006 and 2010, he made 96 league appearances for Pobeda, scoring 39 goals.

In the early weeks of 2010, Nestorovski then moved to Czech First League side Slovácko. He made eleven appearances in the remaining matches of the season, scoring his first and only league goal for that campaign in a 3–1 win over Slavia Prague. The following season, he made seventeen appearances, once more scoring a single league goal.

Nestorovski then went out on loan to Viktoria Žižkov where he spent the first half of the 2011–12 season. He left the relegation battlers in January 2012 and moved to Metalurg Skopje, spending the next twelve months with the club.

After not playing a single game for almost six months, Nestorovski signed for Inter Zaprešić on 9 August 2013, initially on a loan deal. He had a breakout year, scoring 20 times in the Croatian Second Football League and twice in the Croatian Football Cup. He extended his loan deal for another twelve months with Inter over the summer. The following season, Nestorovski found even more success, netting 24 times in 27 league games as Inter were promoted to the Croatian First Football League. Inter then signed him on a permanent deal.

After scoring thirteen times in the first half of the 1. HNL, Nestorovski was signed by Italian Serie A side Palermo, but spent the remainder of the 2015–16 season with Inter. Inter received a transfer fee of €500,000 while the player signed a four-year contract, starting in July 2016. After a first season with eleven goals and three assists he was chosen as captain after deciding to remain in the relegating club of Palermo despite interests from clubs such as Fiorentina and Everton.

On 26 July 2019, Nestorovski signed with Udinese, after Palermo were excluded from Serie B.

International career
Nestorovski played for the Macedonia national under-21 football team, and played in all six of their group matches in the 2013 UEFA European Under-21 Football Championship.

He made his senior international debut for Macedonia in a UEFA Euro 2016 qualifying against Ukraine on 9 October 2015. On 29 May 2016, he scored his first goal for the national team against Azerbaijan in a friendly match in Austria.

Career statistics

Club

International

International goals
As of match played 28 March 2021. North Macedonia score listed first, score column indicates score after each Nestorovski goal.

References

External links
 Profile at Macedonian Football 
 Profile at 1. FC Slovácko website 

1990 births
Living people
Sportspeople from Prilep
Association football forwards
Macedonian footballers
North Macedonia youth international footballers
North Macedonia under-21 international footballers
North Macedonia international footballers
FK Pobeda players
1. FC Slovácko players
FK Viktoria Žižkov players
FK Metalurg Skopje players
NK Inter Zaprešić players
Palermo F.C. players
Udinese Calcio players
Macedonian First Football League players
Czech First League players
Croatian Football League players
First Football League (Croatia) players
Serie A players
Serie B players
Macedonian expatriate footballers
Expatriate footballers in the Czech Republic
Macedonian expatriate sportspeople in the Czech Republic
Expatriate footballers in Croatia
Macedonian expatriate sportspeople in Croatia
Expatriate footballers in Italy
Macedonian expatriate sportspeople in Italy